Laietà Basket Club, nowadays known as Club Esportiu Laietà was the first basketball club founded in Spain.

History
It was founded in Barcelona in 1922 by a group of former students of the "Pious Schools of San Antón" of Barcelona, the school where Father Eusebio Millán introduced the sport of basketball in Spain in 1921. Laietà, is wearing a white shirt with a blue stripe diagonal, he organized the first basketball game held in Spain: it was in Barcelona on December 8, 1922, and CE Europa defeated Laietà by 8-2 in the field of CE Europa, in the district of Gràcia. The members of that first team Laietà (Nogues, Mach, Pardiñas, Ferrer Aragones, Mons and Sanuy) trained three days a week at six o'clock before each one of them dirigiese to work.

Laietà , during the years of Francoist Spain, the basketball club translated its official name to Spanish becoming "Club de Baloncesto Layetano" was one of the most important Catalan sports clubs for decades and one of the best in Spain in the 1930s and 1940s.

The club played four consecutive finals of the Cup of Spain, between 1942 and 1945, being claimed twice champion in 1942 and 1944, after defeating in the final FC Barcelona and Real Madrid, respectively. In 1943 and 1945 lost the finals against FC Barcelona.

The decline of Laietà Basket Club began in 1947. The Spanish basketball began to become professional and best players signed with other clubs offering them jobs or financial compensation. In 1948 there were only three players in the team and the club asked for a year's leave to remake the Catalan Federation. After a year without participating in competitions Laietà returned to competition, but with other objectives focused on the training of young players and not had a chance to compete against FC Barcelona, with several former players Laietà, became the dominator Catalan basketball.

In 1957 Laietà did not participate in the first Spanish basketball league, but it was invited to join it one year later when the league expanded to ten teams. It played one season in the first division but ended it being relegated. In 1962 Laietà finished as champion of the Second Division and came back up to the top league led by Agustí Bertomeu. One year later, the club was again relegated.

The club was on the verge of disappearing in 1964 when it was evicted from its historical playing venue, opened in 1932, and located at the confluence of the Viladomat and Rosselló street, in the Eixample in Barcelona. Stop Mañanet school helped the club for three years hosting the basketball and hockey, and Pompeia Tennis Club supported his tennis section.

In 1967 the club was renamed Club Esportiu Laietà, released and extensive facilities in the Pintor Ribalta district of Les Corts, very close to the facilities of FC Barcelona. Currently the club has 16 tennis clay courts, 6 paddle, 3 sports tracks ... and continues being active in basketball, but away from the highly competitive and focused on the training of young players.

Honours & achievements
Spanish Cup
 Winners (2): 1942, 1944
 Runners-up (2): 1943, 1945
Catalan League
 Winners (2): 1928, 1929
 Runners-up (6): 1930, 1934, 1935, 1942, 1945, 1946

References

Catalan basketball teams
Sports clubs in Barcelona
1921 establishments in Spain